Jim Rockford may refer to:

Jim Rockford (Canadian football player) (born 1961), a former Grey Cup champion defensive back in the Canadian Football League and National Football League
Jim Rockford (television character), played by James Garner, a fictional character on the television series The Rockford Files